Nonoalca the name of a Central American tribe.

The tribe's name was also given to a small sailing boat that was sailed across the Atlantic to Fenit harbour in Tralee Bay by Bill Verity.

Indigenous peoples of Central America